The 2016 Real Salt Lake season was the team's 12th year of existence and their twelfth consecutive season in Major League Soccer, the top division of the American soccer pyramid.

Friendlies

Preseason

Desert Diamond Cup

Friendly

Competitions

MLS regular season

Standings

Western Conference Table

Overall table

Results summary

Match results

MLS Cup Playoffs

Western Conference Knockout Round

U.S. Open Cup 

Real Salt Lake entered the 2016 U.S. Open Cup with the rest of Major League Soccer in the fourth round.

CONCACAF Champions League 

Real Salt Lake will continue the 2015–16 CONCACAF Champions League in the knockout stage with all remaining competitors. Having earned a 3rd-place position in the knockout stage Real Salt Lake will host the second leg of the quarterfinals

Statistics

Stats from MLS Regular season, MLS playoffs, CONCACAF Champions league, and U.S. Open Cup are all included.

Club

Roster
 Age calculated as of the start of the 2016 season.
TransfersAs of March 6, 2016.''

In

Out

Loans

In

Out

References

2016 Major League Soccer season
2016
2016 in sports in Utah
American soccer clubs 2016 season